Inbursa is a financial company which, through its subsidiaries, provides banking and related services in Mexico. The company operates business lines in investment funds, general insurance, automobile insurance, mortgages, health insurance, retirement funds and commercial banking.
The company is owned by Mexican billionaire Carlos Slim.

References

1992 establishments in Mexico
Banks of Mexico
Companies based in Mexico City
Financial services companies established in 1992
Companies listed on the Mexican Stock Exchange
Mexican brands